Strontium Dog: Down to Earth is a Big Finish Productions audio drama, a spin-off from its successful series featuring Judge Dredd in the British comic 2000 AD.

Plot
Johnny Alpha returns to Earth, the planet from which he was exiled long ago, to rescue his kidnapped partner, Wulf Sternhammer.  A few days earlier, Johnny and Wulf were aboard the Doghouse, orbiting above Earth, to view the new bounties being posted.  To their shock, the third and last one posted was for Wulf, a private bounty of 400,000 credits.  Johnny tried to distract the other bounty hunters while Wulf escaped, but bounty hunter "Sick Squid" tricked Wulf into climbing into a re-entry capsule and firing him down to Earth.

Johnny confronts Squid in a bar in Milton Keynes and they quickly come to blows, causing them both to be arrested and thrown in jail.  Johnny is released when Middenface McNulty, posing as his attorney, arrives and threatens the local police.  At first, Johnny is upset to hear McNulty use Johnny's real name to the police, since Johnny is officially exiled from Earth.  McNulty surprises Johnny by telling him that, officially, Johnny doesn't exist - his family erased all traces of him.  Johnny understands that his father, Nelson Kreelman, built his reputation on crusading against "mutant threat," and was ashamed when people learned his own son was a mutant.  McNulty chuckles and says Johnny is only seeing half the reason: Johnny was the leader of the mutant resistance that finally succeeded in getting some legal rights for mutants, and the authorities in New Britain erased his identity out of fear that someone might track him down and convince him to return to Earth and issue a new call to arms.

After returning to the Gronk's hotel room, they check the fine print of Wulf's bounty sheet, and realize that the "crimes" he is accused of are false, and someone has arranged for Wulf to be kidnapped.

McNulty accosts Squid as he is released from jail, and persuades him to tell McNulty where Wulf was delivered to: Essex, a toxic no man's land.  Johnny, McNulty and the Gronk go to the planned meeting in Squid's place, and narrowly escape a sniper attack by two armed thugs; whoever hired Squid clearly never intended to pay him.

The Strontium Dogs follow the thugs' trail back to an abandoned oil derrick, where they confront Wulf's kidnapper: Elizabeth Weisser, a.k.a. "Weisser the Splicer," a.k.a. Johnny's Aunt Lizzie.  Weisser was a close cohort of Johnny's xenophobic father, conducting horrific scientific experiments in an attempt to solve Britain's "mutant problem."  She explains that, after two centuries of radiation exposure, the entire human race is mutated to some degree, but Wulf, who was born in the 8th Century, has the purest human genes in the galaxy.  After extracting his brain and spinal column, Weisser can create a nano-virus that will "reprogram" and restore the human race to purity - though those with the most extreme mutations will die in agonizing pain, "but you have to break a few eggs..."

Weisser's explanation is interrupted when the Gronk sneaks into the room and releases Wulf from his bonds, and the three bounty hunters are able to overpower Weisser's security robots.  Weisser takes a non-fatal gunshot wound in the crossfire, and McNulty plans to turn her in for kidnapping.  Johnny declines any part of the "collar" or the bounty, telling Wulf that he wants to get off Earth before anyone realizes who he is.  He adds, portentously, "this time," indicating that if and when he does come back to Earth, it will be with revolution in mind.

Cast
Simon Pegg - Johnny Alpha
Toby Longworth - Wulf Sternhammer
Jacqueline Pearce - Elizabeth Weisser
Francis Clarke - Val the Bar Girl 
Nicholas Briggs - Sick Squid
John Wadmore - Officer Jowett
Mark Donovan - Officer Tomlin
Mark McDonnell - Middenface McNulty
Patricia Merrick - The Gronk

Related Publications 
Judge Dredd: Pre-Emptive Revenge
Strontium Dog: Fire from Heaven

References

External links
Big Finish Productions

2002 audio plays
Strontium Dog